The German torpedo boat T2 was one of a dozen Type 35 torpedo boats built for the Kriegsmarine (German Navy) during the late 1930s. Completed in 1939, she was not combat ready until mid-1940 when she spent several months escorting minelayers as they laid minefields. The boat returned to Germany after being damaged and supported operations in the Baltic Sea after the start of Operation Barbarossa in June 1941. T2 returned to France at the end of the year, escorting a commerce raider through the English Channel en route, and then escorted a pair of battleships and a heavy cruiser through the Channel back to Germany in early 1942 in the Channel Dash. The boat was placed in reserve upon her return and was transferred back to France in 1943  where she helped to escort blockade runners through the Bay of Biscay. In mid-1943 she returned to the Baltic and briefly served as a flagship of a submarine flotilla before being assigned to the Torpedo School. T2 was sunk in an air raid in July 1944, but was refloated several months later. She was never repaired and was scrapped in 1946.

Design and description
The Type 35 was an unsuccessful attempt by the Kriegsmarine to design a fast, ocean-going torpedo boat that did not exceed the  displacement limit of the London Naval Treaty for ships that counted against the national tonnage limit. Their crew numbered 119 officers and sailors.

As built, the Type 35 class mounted a single  SK C/32 gun on the stern. Anti-aircraft defense was provided by a single  SK C/30 anti-aircraft gun superfiring over the 10.5 cm gun and a pair of  C/30 guns on the bridge wings. They carried six above-water  torpedo tubes in two triple mounts and could also carry 30 mines (or 60 if the weather was good). Many boats exchanged the 3.7 cm gun for another 2 cm gun, depth charges and minesweeping paravanes before completion. Late-war additions were limited to the installation of radar, radar detectors and additional AA guns, usually at the expense of the aft torpedo tube mount.

Construction and career
T2 was ordered on 16 November 1935 from Schichau, laid down at their  Elbing, East Prussia, shipyard on 14 November 1936 as yard number 1381, launched on 7 April 1938 and commissioned on 2 December 1939. The boat was working up until June 1940 when she began convoy escort duties in German waters. The boat was damaged by a bomb splinters from a Bristol Blenheim bomber on the 12th and went to Vlissingen, Netherlands, for repairs before returning to German waters to escort convoys.

T2 began a refit in February 1941 and was then working up until July when she began escorting convoys in the Skaggerak. T2, T5, T7, T8 and T11 were among the escorts for the Baltic Fleet, a temporary formation built around the battleship , as it sortied into the Sea of Åland on 23–29 September to forestall any attempt by the Soviet Red Banner Baltic Fleet to breakout from the Gulf of Finland. Dagö was captured on 12–13 October after T2 is part of a decoy force used to distract the defenders. The ship was briefly refitted in November. Delayed by heavy fog, the ships did not reach Brest, France, until the 15th, while Thor continued onwards into the Atlantic.

Upon her arrival in Germany, T2 was reduced to reserve until she was ordered to France in March 1943. On 5–8 May, the 2nd Torpedo Boat Flotilla with T2, T5 and the torpedo boats  and T22 laid three minefields in the Channel. T2 transferred to the Baltic and served as flagship of the 25th U-boat Flotilla from 10 July to September. The next month she was assigned to the Torpedo School. On 29 July 1944, the boat was sunk by American bombers attacking Bremen. T2 was refloated on 4 September and was towed to Swinemünde on 9 December and then to Schichau's Elbing shipyard for repairs on 31 January 1945. Advancing Soviet forces forced her to be towed back west, unrepaired, the following month. The hulk was reported at Brunsbüttel in May and was broken up at Cuxhaven in 1946.

Notes

References

External links
Type 35 on German Navy.de

Type 35 torpedo boats
1938 ships